The Poet Laureate of Utah is the poet laureate for the U.S. state of Utah. The Utah State Poet Laureate Program was established in 1997. As a joint project of the Governor's Office and the Utah Arts Council Literature Program, the Governor appoints the Utah Poet Laureate for a five-year term.

List of Poets Laureate
 David Lee (1997–2003)
 Ken Brewer (2003–2006)
 Katharine Coles (2006–2012)
 Lance Larsen (2012 – 2017)
 Paisley Rekdal (2017–2022)
 Lisa Bickmore (2022–present)

See also

 Poet laureate
 List of U.S. states' poets laureate
 United States Poet Laureate

References

External links
Poets Laureate of Utah at the Library of Congress
Utah Division of Arts & Museums Poet Laureate Page

 
Utah culture
American Poets Laureate